Ballujeh Mirak (also Romanized as Bāllūjeh Mīrak; also known as Bāllūjeh and Būlūjeh) is a village in Meshgin-e Sharqi Rural District, in the Central District of Meshgin Shahr County, Ardabil Province, Iran. At the 2006 census, its population was 1,723, in 378 families.

References 

Towns and villages in Meshgin Shahr County